Boris Petrovich Kuzmin (11 February 1941 – 30 November 2001) was a Soviet rower who had his best achievements in the coxed fours, partnering with Vladimir Yevseyev, Anatoly Tkachuk, Anatoly Luzgin and Vitaly Kurdchenko. In this event, they won two European titles and a silver medal at the 1966 World Rowing Championships; they finished in fifth place at the 1964 Summer Olympics.

References

1941 births
2001 deaths
Olympic rowers of the Soviet Union
Rowers at the 1964 Summer Olympics
Soviet male rowers
Russian male rowers
World Rowing Championships medalists for the Soviet Union
European Rowing Championships medalists